USS Forbes (IX-90), an unclassified miscellaneous vessel, was the only ship of the United States Navy with that name.  A sailing yacht formerly named Morning Star, Forbes served in a noncommissioned status in the 7th Naval District during World War II.

References 

Unclassified miscellaneous vessels of the United States Navy